Claire Jacquet (born 17 May 1988) is a French slalom canoeist who has competed at the international level since 2006.

She won a bronze medal in the C1 team event at the 2018 ICF Canoe Slalom World Championships in Rio de Janeiro. She also won a silver and a bronze medal in the same event at the European Championships.

World Cup individual podiums

References

External links

Living people
French female canoeists
1988 births
Medalists at the ICF Canoe Slalom World Championships
People from Bar-le-Duc
Sportspeople from Meuse (department)